Thomas J. Scrimenti (born January 28, 1960) is a former Democratic member of the Pennsylvania House of Representatives.

He is a 1978 graduate of North East High School in North East, Pennsylvania. He earned a degree in criminal justice from Gannon University in 1984.

He served as member of the school board of the North East School District from 1979 to 1981 and as mayor of North East, Pennsylvania from 1982 to 1989. He was first elected to represent the 4th legislative district in the Pennsylvania House of Representatives in 1988. He was defeated for re-election in the 2004 election by Republican Curt Sonney.

In 2005, Scrimenti began serving as an Assistant Secretary of State under Ed Rendell. He held that position until 2009.

References

External links
Pennsylvania House of Representatives - Tom Scrimenti (Democrat) official PA House profile (archived)
Pennsylvania House Democratic Caucus - Tom Scrimenti official Party website (archived)

1960 births
Living people
Politicians from Erie, Pennsylvania
Democratic Party members of the Pennsylvania House of Representatives